Istralandia is a water park in Brtonigla municipality, Istria County, Croatia. Opened for visitors in June 2014, it was the first Croatian water park. 

Awards
Aquapark Istralandia won a special award for the entrepreneurial project of the year in the category of new parks in Europe at the 13th Best Amusement Parks Award Ceremony, which took place in Rome on 25 October 2014.
The Parksmania award is a prestigious recognition awarded by the Parksmania.it magazine to the best amusement parks in Italy and Europe.

In the 2016 Euro Attractions Show in Barcelona, hosted by the International Association of Amusement Parks and Attractions, a 34-member international jury ranked Istralandia 5th among more than 300 water parks in Europe.

Sources

External links 

 

2014 establishments in Croatia
Istria County
Water parks in Croatia